The Bend Bucks were a minor league baseball team located in Bend, Oregon. The Bucks were members of the Class A Short Season Northwest League from 1987 to 1991.

History
Following the 1986 season the Philadelphia Phillies ended their affiliation with Bend after eight years. Despite losing their agreement, baseball returned to Bend for the 1987 season. The club held a name the team contest and of the roughly sixty entries the nickname Bucks was selected. The team played as a co-op composed of prospects from the Dodgers, Padres, Pirates, and Rangers along with members of the Phillies including manager Mel Roberts. 

After playing their first year as a co-op team, Bend signed a player development contract with the California Angels. The Bucks first season with the Angels would be their best as the team posted a record of 38-38. Two years into a three season agreement the Angels terminated their affiliation with Bend on the grounds of poor conditions at Vince Genna Stadium. The Angels moved their short season affiliation to Boise. Bend was again without a parent club. In 1990 the Bucks roster consisted of players from several organizations, including the Athletics, Phillies, and Giants. The following year was much of the same roster composition with nine organizations were represented on the 1991 team managed by Bill Stein.

After playing two seasons as a co-op the franchise inked an agreement with the Colorado Rockies and subsequently changed their name to the Bend Rockies.

Ballpark
The Bucks played at Vince Genna Stadium located in Bend, Oregon.

Identity
In changing their name to the Bucks, the club adopted new colors. The Bend Bulletin wrote that the team colors would be navy blue and red, with home uniforms and hats looking similar to those worn by the Boston Red Sox. Upon signing a working agreement with the Angels in 1988, gold was incorporated into the color scheme.

Season-by-season record

Former players
Bend Bucks players (1987–1991)

References

External links
 Stats Crew Bend Bucks

Defunct Northwest League teams
Los Angeles Angels minor league affiliates
Defunct baseball teams in Oregon
Professional baseball teams in Oregon
Baseball teams disestablished in 1991
Baseball teams established in 1987